Group D of the 2019 AFC Asian Cup took place from 7 to 16 January 2019. The group consisted of Iran, Iraq, Vietnam and Yemen. The top two teams, Iran and Iraq, along with third-placed Vietnam (as one of the four best third-placed teams), advanced to the round of 16.

The group contained two former champions, Iran (3 titles) and Iraq (1 title). Yemen made their debut at the tournament.

Teams

Notes

Standings

In the round of 16:
 The winners of Group D, Iran, advanced to play the third-placed team of Group F, Oman.
 The runners-up of Group D, Iraq, advanced to play the winners of Group E, Qatar.
 The third-placed team of Group D, Vietnam, advanced to play the winners of Group B, Jordan (as one of the four best third-placed teams).

Matches
All times listed are GST (UTC+4).

Iran vs Yemen

Yemen had the first chance of the match in the seventh minute when Ahmed Al-Sarori ran into the penalty area and flashed a shot narrowly over the bar. Mehdi Taremi opened the scoring in the 12th minute when he converted the rebound after Yemeni goalkeeper Saoud Al-Sowadi pushed Sardar Azmoun's long-range effort back into his path. At 23 minutes, Ashkan Dejagah's free kick found the back of the net via a combination of both the woodwork and Al-Sowadi, before Taremi bagged his second of the night by heading home Ramin Rezaeian's cross moments later. In the second half, after Al-Sowadi had repelled two Azmoun headers, the forward finished from close-range on 53 minutes to further extend Iran's lead. Azmoun was later denied by Mudir Al-Radaei's challenge when through on goal and his shot struck the bar with 14 minutes remaining. Substitute Saman Ghoddos added a fifth from the edge of the area shortly after, while Mehdi Torabi's drive struck the post in added time.

Iraq vs Vietnam
Iraq and Vietnam have only met once at the Asian Cup back in 2007, when Iraq defeated Vietnam 2–0 on the road to their first Asian title.

After a slow start to the proceedings, Iraq came closest to breaking the deadlock through Hussein Ali's shot from distance which Đặng Văn Lâm tipped around his left-hand post on 14 minutes. Vietnam took the lead 10 minutes later, Nguyễn Quang Hải’s attempted pass saw defender Ali Faez turn the ball past the onrushing Jalal Hassan and into his own net. Iraq scored the equaliser shortly after the half-hour mark when Đỗ Duy Mạnh's defensive lapse saw Mohanad Ali surge into the area and fire home past a diving Văn Lâm. With three minutes of the first period remaining, Vietnam regained the lead as Nguyễn Công Phượng bundled home the rebound after Nguyễn Trọng Hoàng's shot had been parried into his path by Hassan. After the break, Safaa Hadi was denied by Văn Lâm and on the other end, Hassan dived to smother a Công Phượng effort. In the 60th minute, substitute Humam Tariq smashed the ball into the roof of the net after Vietnam had failed to clear Mohanad Ali's close-range effort. Ali Adnan curled home a 90th minute free kick from 20 yards to seal the victory for Iraq.

Vietnam vs Iran

Iran had the first chance of the game, Vahid Amiri failed to apply a finishing touch at the far post following Ashkan Dejagah’s 11th minute corner. Vietnamese goalkeeper Đặng Văn Lâm then denied Saman Ghoddos before producing another stop to repel a Sardar Azmoun drive shortly before the half-hour mark. The breakthrough came on at 38 minutes when Azmoun headed home a Ghoddos cross, sending his side into the half-time break holding a slender lead. In the 52nd minute, substitute Nguyễn Văn Toàn's pass found Nguyễn Công Phượng, whose shot from 12 yards was parried to safety by the advancing Alireza Beiranvand. Moments later, Azmoun forced Văn Lâm into another save, only to see Mehdi Taremi lash the subsequent rebound wide off the target. At 68 minutes, Azmoun gathered a Mehdi Torabi pass and fired past Văn Lâm to extend his side’s advantage and register his third goal of the tournament. Nguyễn Quang Hải then curled a late effort narrowly off target and Iran held on to register a record ninth successive AFC Asian Cup group stage victory.

Yemen vs Iraq
Iraq took the lead in the 11th minute when Mohanad Ali beat the Yemen defence before unleashing a shot from outside the box into the bottom right corner. Yemen had their first look at goal from a set-piece five minutes later, but Abdulwasea Al-Matari sent his header just above the bar. Yemen goalkeeper Saoud Al-Sowadi soon conceded the second goal in the 19th minute when Bashar Resan's strike from the top of the box bounced off the right post before settling in the net. In the second half, both teams came close to finding the net with Ahmed Abdulrab's right-footed shot from outside the box just being kept out by Iraq goalkeeper Jalal Hassan in the 59th minute. Iraq responded five minutes later, with Mohanad coming close to getting his second but his lob was denied by the post and Ahmed Yasin missed the chance to tuck the rebound home. Iraq ended proceedings on a high note as Alaa Abbas scored with a left-footed shot from the centre of the box and into the net.

Vietnam vs Yemen
Mudir Al-Radaei involved himself in an altercation with Nguyễn Công Phượng to concede a free kick, picking up a yellow card from referee Ahmed Al-Kaf and from the resulting free kick, Vietnam took the lead. Nguyễn Quang Hải sent a left-foot strike from 25 yards curling away from Salem Al-Harsh and into the top corner of the goal. Ten minutes into the second half, a move started by Đỗ Hùng Dũng's angled ball down the right allowed Nguyễn Trọng Hoàng to pull his cross back to Công Phượng, only for his shot to be blocked by the Yemeni defence. Seconds later, Hùng Dũng’s shot was collected by Al-Harsh. Ahmed Al-Sarori outpaced Đoàn Văn Hậu before firing a right foot shot that flew across the face of goal. Four minutes after the hour mark, though, Vietnam added the second from the penalty spot. Phan Văn Đức burst past Abdulaziz Al-Gumaei, surging into the box before the Yemeni defender wrestled him to the ground. Quế Ngọc Hải calmly slid the spot kick home to give Vietnam the win. However, as Vietnam was unable to score more than two goals, Vietnam had been forced to wait until the final group stage matches, in which they managed to become the last team to qualify for the knockout stage.

Iran vs Iraq

 
Iran had the first chance at goal in the 12th minute when Vahid Amiri sent a cross into the box but Sardar Azmoun’s header was just off the mark. Three minutes from the half-time whistle, Alireza Jahanbakhsh latched on to Azmoun’s deflected attempt but couldn’t get his left-footed strike on target. Iran, in a bid to break down the Iraq defence, boosted their attacking prowess by bringing on Mehdi Taremi and Mehdi Torabi in the 63rd and 75th minutes respectively. However, it was Iraq who nearly took the lead in the 77th minute when substitute Alaa Abbas’s header was tipped over the bar by Alireza Beiranvand. As the minutes ticked away, neither team was able to make headway as they settled for a share of the spoils.

Discipline
Fair play points were used as tiebreakers if the head-to-head and overall records of teams were tied (and if a penalty shoot-out was not applicable as a tiebreaker). These were calculated based on yellow and red cards received in all group matches as follows:
yellow card = 1 point
red card as a result of two yellow cards = 3 points
direct red card = 3 points
yellow card followed by direct red card = 4 points

Only one of the above deductions was applied to a player in a single match.

References

External links
 

Group D
2018–19 in Iranian football
2018–19 in Iraqi football
2019 in Vietnamese football
2019 in Yemen